Clarence Leonard Tommerson (April 8, 1915 – January 6, 2000) was an American football halfback in the National Football League. He played for the Pittsburgh Pirates in 1938. 

Tommerson was born on April 8, 1915 in La Crosse, Wisconsin and attended Logan High School. He went on to play football at the collegiate level at the University of Wisconsin–Madison. In September 1979, he married Audrey Tommerson, with whom he went to nearly every Super Bowl during their marriage.

See also
List of Pittsburgh Steelers players

References

1915 births
2000 deaths
Sportspeople from La Crosse, Wisconsin
Logan High School (La Crosse, Wisconsin) alumni
Players of American football from Wisconsin
American football halfbacks
Wisconsin Badgers football players
Pittsburgh Pirates (football) players